Coniogenes is a genus of moth in the family Blastobasidae. It contains the single species Coniogenes contempta, which is found in Taiwan.

References

Blastobasidae genera
Monotypic moth genera
Moths of Asia